Borneo Football Club Samarinda (commonly known as Borneo Samarinda) is an Indonesian football club based in Samarinda, East Kalimantan, Indonesia. They currently compete in Liga 1. Their nickname is Pesut Etam (Our Dolphin).

History 
Borneo F.C. Samarinda was formed by former Putra Samarinda supporters who were dissatisfied with their team's lack of achievements. PT Nahusam Pratama Indonesia bought Perseba Super Bangkalan on 7 March 2014, which gave them direct license to compete in the 2014 Liga Indonesia Premier Division, and changed the name to Pusamania Borneo F.C.

After beating PSGC Ciamis on penalties in the 2014 Liga Indonesia Premier Division semi-final, they were promoted to the Indonesia Super League. On 27 November 2014, Borneo FC won their first title by becoming champion of the 2014 Liga Indonesia Premier Division after beating Persiwa Wamena 2–1 in the final.

Colours and badges

Sponsorship 
Suzuki signed a two-year sponsorship deal with Borneo F.C. Samarinda on 22 April 2014. On 2 May 2014, Bankaltim became their shirt sponsor for home and away matches.

Kit suppliers

Stadium 
Borneo F.C. Samarinda play their home matches at Segiri Samarinda Stadium and Palaran Stadium. They use Sempaja Stadium for training.

Players

Current squad

Naturalized players

Out on loan

Technical staff

Club culture

Supporters 
Borneo's supporters are called Curva Sud Samarinda.

Derbies 
Derby Kaltim (East Borneo derby)The match of Borneo F.C. against Persiba Balikpapan is called "Derby Kaltim", because Samarinda (city home of Borneo FC) and Balikpapan (city home of Persiba Balikpapan) are the same as cities in East Kalimantan Province.

Derby PapadaanThe match of Borneo F.C. against Barito Putera is called "Derby Papadaan" or The Brother's Derby.

Derby MahakamThe match of Borneo F.C. against Mitra Kukar F.C. is called "Derby Mahakam", because Samarinda city home of Borneo F.C, and Tenggarong city home of Mitra Kukar, are same followed by the Mahakam river.

Coaches

Honours 

 Liga Indonesia Premier Division
 Winners: 2014 (second-tier era)
 Indonesia President's Cup
 Runners-up: 2017, 2022
 Piala Gubernur Kaltim
 Winners: 2016

See also 

 List of football clubs in Indonesia
 Indonesian football league system

References

External links 
  
 Pusamania Borneo F.C. at Liga Indonesia 
 Pusamania Borneo F.C. Profile on Eyesoccer club Football Database 
 

 
Football clubs in Indonesia
Football clubs in East Kalimantan
Fan-owned football clubs
Association football clubs established in 2014
2014 establishments in Indonesia
Samarinda
Phoenix clubs (association football)